Hattie Stewart is an illustrator and artist. She is best known for a technique called 'doodle-bombs', where she illustrates over magazine covers.

Life and career 
A native of Colchester, Stewart studied illustration at Kingston University, from which she graduated in 2010, and is now based in London, United Kingdom.

She is best known for her so-called 'doodle-bombs' where she illustrates over magazine covers, as well as her playful and brightly coloured iconography. Stewart's art has been featured in numerous advertising campaigns, painted as large-scale murals and used as print designs on clothing and footwear. In 2021, she was commissioned to create the design for a basketball court in Portsmouth. Her commission was financed by a crowdfunding campaign. In 2023, the video game Fall Guys did a collaboration with her.

Her work is often created with acrylic pens from the brand POSCA.

Selected solo exhibitions 
 Lazy Days, 2021, at Hen's Teeth in Dublin, Ireland.
I Don't Have Time for This, 2018, at NOW Gallery in London, United Kingdom.
 Adversary, 2015, at House of Illustration, London, United Kingdom.
 Dollhouse, 2015, at KK Outlet, London, United Kingdom

Published works 
 Living With: Hattie Stewart. Roads Publishing, 2016
 Hattie Stewart's Doodlebomb Sticker Book. Laurence King Publishing, 2017
 Hello Cheeky: 50 Postcards with Stickers. Clarkson Potter Publishers, 2020
 From One Universe to Another. Colour Code Printing, 2021

Selected awards 
 ADC Young Guns 15, 2017

References

External links 
 Official website

Year of birth missing (living people)
Living people
People from Colchester
Alumni of Kingston University
British women illustrators
21st-century British women artists